Diana Tomkinson (born 23 April 1943 in London) is a British former alpine skier who competed in the 1968 Winter Olympics.

References

External links
 

1943 births
Living people
Sportspeople from London
British female alpine skiers
Olympic alpine skiers of Great Britain
Alpine skiers at the 1968 Winter Olympics